Ricky Ray Grace  (born August 20, 1966) is an American-Australian former professional basketball player who spent the majority of his career in the Australian National Basketball League with the Perth Wildcats.

Playing career 

Ricky "Amazing" Grace first played college basketball at Midland College, transferring after two years to the University of Oklahoma alongside future NBA player Mookie Blaylock. In 1988, his last year at Oklahoma, Grace helped the Oklahoma Sooners reach the championship game of the NCAA men's basketball tournament, where they were defeated by the Kansas Jayhawks.

Selected in the 1988 NBA Draft by the Utah Jazz in the third round (67th overall), he failed to make the active roster of an NBA team. Soon after, Grace was invited by then Perth Wildcats general manager (and 1990 head coach) Cal Bruton to play for the Australian club, where he played his entire professional career, and captained the club from 2002/03 until his retirement. During his time with the club Grace played an integral part in six grand finals appearances and four championships, twice being award Grand Final MVP; first in 1990 when the Wildcats defeated the Brisbane Bullets to claim their first championship, and again in 1993 when the Wildcats were defeated by the Melbourne Tigers.

1991 was filled with more success for Grace, as the Wildcats won back-to-back championships, defeating the Eastside Spectres, and Grace was selected to the All-NBL First Team.

In 1993, Grace had a three-game stint with the Atlanta Hawks, where he was reunited with college teammate Mookie Blaylock.

In late 1994, Grace became naturalised as an Australian citizen and in March 1995 made his international debut when he was selected for the Australian Boomers in their 5-game series against the touring Magic Johnson All-Stars. 1995 also saw the Wildcats win their 3rd NBL crown, defeating the defending champion North Melbourne Giants in the Grand Final series. As Champions, the Wildcats were invited to participate in the 1995 McDonald's Championship in London. The Wildcats lost to NBA champions the Houston Rockets before defeating Real Madrid in their second match.

In 1996, Grace signed a 6-year contract with the Wildcats and was considered unlucky not to gain a place in the Boomers squad for the 1996 Olympics in Atlanta. Four years later he did make it to the Olympics when he was a member of the Boomers squad at the Sydney Olympic Games in 2000, helping the home country to 4th place. This capped off another successful year for Grace, who won his fourth championship when the Wildcats defeated the Victoria Titans.

In the second half of his career, Grace adjusted his game to become more of an offensive threat, and he was rewarded with another All-NBL First Team selection in 2001, 10 years after the first, and again in 2002 and 2003. Despite playing arguably the best basketball of his career, the Wildcats would only make one more grand final series, in 2002/2003, when they were defeated by the Sydney Kings, meaning Grace would fail to equal the then record of Larry Sengstock who won five NBL championships.

In 2003 Grace was selected to the NBL's 25th Anniversary Team. He would play for two more seasons, with his last game a loss in an elimination final against the Melbourne Tigers on February 24, 2005.

On August 4, 2010, it was announced that Grace is to be inducted into the Australian Basketball Hall of Fame (ABHF) at a ceremony on August 18, 2010.

Grace was surprised to be inducted as he felt he wouldn't be considered for the Hall of Fame before former teammate James Crawford was.

Post playing career 

Currently Grace is the director for the Role Models WA organisation. Role Models WA offers sport and development programs for indigenous communities in Western Australia. Other role models that work alongside Grace include numerous football players from the Fremantle Dockers and West Coast Eagles including Chris Lewis, David Wirrpanda, Des Headland and Daniel Kerr.

On February 4, 2013, Grace was named to the Perth Wildcats' 30th Anniversary All-Star team.

Oklahoma Sooners Team records 
 First in three-point field goal percentage in a season - 1986/87 (.441)
 First in assists in a season - 1987/88 (280)
 Equal First in steals in an NCAA Tournament game - vs Iowa, March 20, 1987 (7)

Perth Wildcats Team records 
 First in games played (482)
 First in points (8802)
 First in assists (3470)
 First in steals (734)

NBL records 
 First in assists per game in 2003 (8.0/27 games)
 First in assists per game in 2004 (7.3/23 games)

References 

1966 births
Living people
American emigrants to Australia
American expatriate basketball people in Australia
American men's basketball players
Atlanta Hawks players
Australian men's basketball players
Basketball players at the 2000 Summer Olympics
Basketball players from Dallas
Members of the Order of Australia
Midland Chaps basketball players
Oklahoma Sooners men's basketball players
Olympic basketball players of Australia
Perth Wildcats players
Point guards
Topeka Sizzlers players
Utah Jazz draft picks
United States Basketball League players